Republika  is a newspaper published in Tirana, Albania.

History and profile
Republika was established in 1991. The paper has its headquarters in Tirana. It was owned by the Republican Party in the early 2000s. It is part of R Group.al Society Ltd. The paper is published six times a week in tabloid format.

Sections
The newspaper is organized in three sections, including the magazine.
 News: Includes International, National, Tirana, Politics, Business, Technology, Science, Health, Sports, Education.
 Opinion: Includes Editorials, Op-Eds and Letters to the Editor.
 Features: Includes Arts, Movies, Theatre, and Sport.

Republika has had a web presence since 2007, accessing articles requires no registration.

References

1991 establishments in Albania
Albanian-language newspapers
Party newspapers published in Albania
Mass media in Tirana
Publications established in 1991